Serajul Huq is a male Muslim given name. Notable bearers of the name include:

 Serajul Huq (educator) (1905-2005), Bangladeshi educator
 Sirajul Haque Khan (1924-1971), Bangladeshi educator
 Serajul Huq (politician) (1925-2003), Bangladeshi lawyer
 Sirajul Haq Memon (1933–2013), Pakistani Sindhi language novelist, journalist, historian, linguist, and advocate of the Supreme Court
 Sirajul Haq (born 1962), Pakistani politician
 Sirajul Haq (Bangladeshi politician)
 Siraj-ul-Haque, Pakistani television director

Arabic masculine given names